Energy bill might refer to:

The United States' Energy Policy Act of 1992
The United States' Energy Policy Act of 2005

or 

The United Kingdom's 
 Energy Act 2004
 Energy Act 2010
 Energy Bill 2012 - 2013